Mercy College, Palakkad, is a general degree women's college located in Palakkad (Palghat), Kerala. It was established in the year 1965. The college is affiliated with Calicut University. This college offers different courses in arts, commerce and science.

History
Mercy College was established in 1964. It was initially an offshoot of St. Mary's College, Trichur and was the first women's college in Palghat district. It was affiliated to Kerala University until 1968 when Calicut University came into existence.

Departments

Science

Physics
Chemistry
Mathematics
Botany
Zoology
Computer Science
Biotechnology

Arts and Commerce

Malayalam
English
Hindi
History
Political Science
Economics
Sociology
Social Work
Commerce

Accreditation
The college is  recognized by the University Grants Commission (UGC).

Notable alumni
 Methil Devika, Dancer, Professor
 K. Shanthakumari, Kongad MLA

References

External links
http://www.mercycollege.edu.in

Universities and colleges in Palakkad
Educational institutions established in 1964
1964 establishments in Kerala
Arts and Science colleges in Kerala
Colleges affiliated with the University of Calicut